Kališti is a village in the municipality of Vrapčište, North Macedonia. It used to be part of Negotino-Pološko Municipality.

History
According to the 1467-68 Ottoman defter, Kališti appears as being largely inhabited by an Orthodox Christian population. Some families had a mixed Slav-Albanian anthroponomy - usually a Slavic first name and an Albanian last name or last names with Albanian patronyms and Slavic suffixes.

Demographics
As of the 2021 census, Kalište had 511 residents with the following ethnic composition:
Albanians 482
Persons for whom data are taken from administrative sources 29

According to the 2002 census, the village had a total of 681 inhabitants. Ethnic groups in the village include:

Albanians 668
Macedonians 1
Others 12

References

External links

Villages in Vrapčište Municipality
Albanian communities in North Macedonia